Brick Bradford (1947) was the 35th serial released by Columbia Pictures. It was based on the comic strip Brick Bradford, which was created by Clarence Gray and William Ritt.

Plot
Brick Bradford is assigned by the government to aid Doctor  Gregor Tymak, scientist and inventor who is working on an "Interceptor Ray" that can destroy incoming rockets.  Unfortunately, it can also be used as a death ray, bringing it to the attention of foreign spy agent Laydron. Tymak uses his door into the fifth dimension to escape criminals and it takes him to the far side of the Moon (which luckily has air and is a rocky terrain without craters). There he is captured and sentenced to die by freezing to absolute zero by the Queen Khana, despot of the Moon, because they do not believe he has come from the Earth.

The action moves to the Moon as the ray requires a special element called Lunarium (with an atomic mass of 200) previously only found in a meteorite.  Working with exiles in the lunar wasteland, the heroes overthrow Queen Khana and return with the Lunarium.

However, the device still requires a formula hidden on an uncharted island 200 years in the past, so Brick and sidekick Sandy Sanderson travel in Tymak's time machine, the Time Top, to retrieve it.  The final third of the serial is spent on modern day Earth with more trouble from the spy Laydron.

Cast
 Kane Richmond as Brick Bradford
 Rick Vallin as Sandy Sanderson
 Linda Leighton as June Salisbury (as Linda Johnson)
 Pierre Watkin as Prof. Salisbury
 Charles Quigley as Laydron
 Jack Ingram as Albers 
 Fred Graham as Black
 John Merton as Dr. Gregor Tymak
 Leonard Penn as Eric Byrus
 Wheeler Oakman as Louis Walthar
 Carol Forman as Queen Khana
 Charles King as Creed [Ch. 1-7, 9-15]
 John Hart as Dent [Ch. 1-6, 9-15]
 Helene Stanley as Carol Preston [Ch. 4-6]

Production
Brick Bradford was the first of only three science fiction serials released by Columbia.

The serial was broken into three sections, each of which was written by a different screenwriter.  The first section, chapters one to five, was written by George Plympton.  The middle section, chapters six to ten, was written by Hoerl.  The end of the serial, chapters eleven to fifteen, was written by Clay.

Critical reception
Harmon and Glut describes the serial as a "rather shoddy, low budget space cliffhanger."  Hoerl's middle segment is full of in-jokes at the serial's expense while the final section by Clay is boring with a constant repetition of capture and escape sequences.

Cline considers Brick Bradford to be a "mediocre serial that enjoyed a wide audience."

Chapter titles
 Atomic Defense
 Flight to the Moon
 Prisoners of the Moon
 Into the Volcano
 Bradford at Bay
 Back to Earth
 Into Another Century
 Buried Treasure
 Trapped in the Time Top
 The Unseen Hand
 Poison Gas
 Door to Disaster
 Sinister Rendezvous
 River of Revenge
 For the Peace of the World
Source:

Alternative titles
Brick Bradford (Latin America)
Aventures of Brick Bradford, Les (France)
Zÿn Avonturen Brick Bradford, En (Belgium)

References

External links

Brick Bradford at Todd Gault's Movie Serial Experience

1947 films
1940s English-language films
1940s science fiction films
American black-and-white films
Columbia Pictures film serials
Films based on comic strips
Films directed by Spencer Gordon Bennet
Films directed by Thomas Carr
Moon in film
American science fiction films
Films with screenplays by George H. Plympton
1940s American films